Luigi Luiggi (born 3 August 1856 in Genoa - 1 February 1931 in Rome) was an Italian engineer and politician. He was a senator for the Italian parliament. He led the Cabinet on the Ministry of Public Works from 1892 to 1893. He received the Order of the Crown of Italy and French Legion of Honour.

References

Engineers from Genoa
1856 births
1931 deaths
Politicians from Genoa
Members of the Senate of the Republic (Italy)
Recipients of the Legion of Honour
19th-century Italian politicians
20th-century Italian politicians